Duke of Saldanha (in Portuguese Duque de Saldanha) is a Portuguese title granted by royal decree of Queen Maria II of Portugal, dated from November 4, 1846, to João Carlos Saldanha de Oliveira Daun (1790-1876), also known as Marshal Saldanha, leader of the liberal armies, during the Liberal Wars in Portugal.

Queen Maria II of Portugal had successively upgraded the Marshal Saldanha title from Count (1833), to Marquis (1834) and, finally, to Duke of Saldanha (1846).

List of the Dukes of Saldanha
D. João Carlos de Saldanha Oliveira e Daun (1790-1876)
D. João Carlos de Saldanha Oliveira e Daun (1825-1880)
D. João Carlos de Saldanha Oliveira e Daun (1889-1954)
D. José Augusto de Saldanha Oliveira e Daun (1894-1970)
D. José Augusto de Saldanha Oliveira e Daun (1921-2011)
D. João Carlos Duarte de Saldanha e Daun (1947-)

Other titles
The Duke of Saldanha also holds the following titles:
Count of Saldanha, by decree of Queen Maria II of Portugal, dated from January 14, 1833
Marquis of Saldanha, by decree of Queen Maria II of Portugal, dated from May 27, 1834
Count of Almoster, by decree of Queen Maria II of Portugal, dated from December 1, 1834

See also
List of Portuguese Dukedoms
List of Portuguese Prime Ministers

References

Bibliography
"Nobreza de Portugal e do Brasil" – Vol. III, page 260/274. Published by Zairol Lda., Lisbon 1989.

External links
 Genealogy of the Dukes of Saldanha

 
Dukedoms of Portugal
Portuguese nobility
Portuguese noble families
1846 establishments in Portugal